The Great Waldo Pepper is a 1975 American drama film directed, produced, and co-written by George Roy Hill. Set during 1926–1931, the film stars Robert Redford as a disaffected World War I veteran pilot who missed the opportunity to fly in combat, and examines his sense of postwar dislocation in 1920s America. The cast includes Margot Kidder, Bo Svenson, Edward Herrmann and Susan Sarandon. The Great Waldo Pepper depicts barnstorming during the 1920s and the accidents that led to aviation regulations by the Air Commerce Act.

Plot
1926: World War I veteran Waldo Pepper feels he has missed out on the glory of aerial combat after being made a flight instructor. After the war, Waldo had taken up barnstorming to make a living. He soon tangles with rival barnstormer (and fellow war veteran) Axel Olsson.

Antagonistic at first, Waldo and Axel become partners and try out various stunts. One of these stunts, a car-to-aircraft transfer, goes wrong and Waldo is nearly killed after Axel is unable to climb high enough to clear a barn, slamming Waldo into it.  Waldo then goes home to Kansas to be with on-again, off-again girlfriend Maude and her family. Maude is not happy to see Waldo at first, as every time he returns from a barnstorming tour of the country, he is injured in some way. Eventually, they make up and become lovers once again. Meanwhile, Maude's brother Ezra, a long-time friend of Waldo's since boyhood, promises to build Waldo a high-performance monoplane as soon as he is well enough to fly it. Waldo's goal is to become the first pilot in history to successfully perform an outside loop, and Ezra feels Waldo can do it with the monoplane.

In the meantime, Waldo rejoins Axel. The two eventually get a job flying for a traveling flying circus owned by Doc Dillhoefer. However, Dillhoefer's Flying Circus is in a slump, as there is very little attendance at the shows. In an effort to attract bigger crowds, Dillhoefer hires Mary Beth to act as the show's new sexual attraction, in which she would climb out on the wing of an aircraft in flight wearing shredded clothes, thus allowing the wind to blow them off. But while performing this new stunt for the first time, Mary Beth freezes up on the wing, afraid to return to the cockpit. As Waldo (who did a "plane-to-plane transfer" in flight to climb aboard Mary Beth's aircraft) extends his hand to help Mary Beth back into the cockpit, she slips and falls off the wing to her death. As a result of Mary Beth's death, Waldo, Axel, and Dillhoefer are temporarily grounded by an inspector of the newly formed Air Commerce division of the federal government, Newt Potts, a man from Waldo's wartime past.

Soon after, at the Muncie Fair, another tragedy occurs with the Dillhoefer Circus when Ezra (flying in place of the grounded Waldo) attempts the outside loop in the monoplane.  He crashes on his third attempt, and the crowd rushes out of the stands to see the wreckage.  One of the spectators carelessly flicks a cigarette into gas leaking from the aircraft, igniting it. Helpless against the flames, Waldo kills Ezra with a piece of lumber to spare him the agony of being burned alive. Because no one helped Waldo try to save him, Waldo goes on a rampage, jumps in one of Dillhoefer's aircraft and begins buzzing the crowd away from the wreckage. He ends up crashing into a carnival area, which leads to his permanent grounding.

Waldo goes to Hollywood where Axel is working as a stuntman, and Waldo and Axel get jobs as stunt pilots in an upcoming film depicting the air battles of the Great War. Axel has been cleared of his grounding and reinstated as a pilot,  but Waldo uses an alias so that he can dodge his grounding and fly in the film. Famous German air ace Ernst Kessler has also been hired by the producers as a consultant and to fly a Fokker Dr. I replica in the film. (The disillusioned, bitter and heavy drinking depiction of Kessler is based on the real German ace and stunt pilot Ernst Udet.)

During filming of a famous wartime duel, Waldo in a Sopwith Camel and Kessler in the Fokker—although their aircraft are disarmed—begin dogfighting in deadly earnest, using their aircraft as weapons, repeatedly playing chicken and colliding with each other. Eventually, Waldo damages Kessler's aircraft so badly that it is no longer airworthy, and Kessler surrenders to Waldo. Waldo and Kessler then salute each other and fly their separate ways, Waldo unable to land without crashing due to damaged landing gear. As the sound fades, the last shot of the film is of a page in a photo album. One of the pictures is of Waldo, and beneath it is a caption that reads, "Waldo Pepper. 1895–1931".

Cast

 Robert Redford as Waldo Pepper
 Bo Svenson as Axel Olsson
 Bo Brundin as Ernst Kessler
 Susan Sarandon as Mary Beth
 Geoffrey Lewis as Newt Potts
 Edward Herrmann as Ezra Stiles
 Philip Bruns as Doc Dillhoefer
 Roderick Cook as Werfel
 Kelly Jean Peters as Patsy
 Margot Kidder as Maude Stiles
 Roderick Cook as Werfel
 Scott Newman as Duke
 James S. Appleby as Ace
 Patrick W. Henderson as Scooter
 James N. Harrell as the unnamed farmer (Scooter's father)
 Elma Aicklen as the unnamed farmer's wife (Scooter's mother)
 Deborah Knapp as the unnamed farmer's daughter (Scooter's sister)
 John A. Zee as the unnamed director of the Old West saloon set
 John Reilly as the unnamed star in the western movie
 Jack Manning as the unnamed director of the Spanish movie set
 Joe Billings as the unnamed policeman
 Robert W. Winn as the unnamed theater manager
 Lawrence P. Casey as the unnamed German actor portraying Kessler
 Greg Martin as the unnamed assistant director
 Frank Price as Kessler when flying

Production
The Great Waldo Pepper was a "passion project" for director George Roy Hill, who was himself a pilot. He and William Goldman had what Goldman described as "a huge falling out" during the middle of Goldman's writing the screenplay. Nevertheless, they managed to complete the project.

Frank Tallman flew the air sequences using actual aircraft – not models. Waldo flew a Standard J-1 biplane. Many of the other aircraft in the film, including Axel's and those of Dillhoefer's, were Curtiss JN-4 biplanes. A number of de Havilland Tiger Moth biplanes, modified to look like Curtiss JN-4s, were used for the crash scenes.

The Great Waldo Pepper was filmed in Elgin, Texas. Aerial sequences were filmed at Zuehl Airfield near San Antonio, which is not too far from Fort Sam Houston, where the pioneering silent aviation classic Wings was shot in 1926-27.  Several aerial scenes were also filmed over the Sebring Regional Airport in Sebring, Florida. Hill, who flew as a U.S. Marine Corps cargo pilot in World War II, made sure stars Bo Svenson and Robert Redford did each sequence with no parachutes or safety harnesses. He wanted them to feel what it was like to fly vintage aircraft. Fortunately, no one was hurt during the air scenes.

Reception

Box office
The film earned $9.4 million at the box office in the U.S. during its year of initial release.

Critical
The Great Waldo Pepper opened to mixed to good reviews, with the biggest praise going to the film's aerial sequences. Vincent Canby of The New York Times wrote, "'The Great Waldo Pepper' is a most appealing movie. Its moods don't quite mesh and its aerial sequences are so vivid— sometimes literally breathtaking— that they upstage the human drama, but the total effect is healthily romantic."

Leonard Maltin noted that the film disappointed at the box office, and, although compared to earlier efforts such as The Sting (1973), it was director George Roy Hill's "more personal" account that "... wavers uncomfortably between slapstick and drama."

The aerial sequences staged by Frank Tallman included the climactic fight between Waldo Pepper and Kessler. The scene featuring a replica Sopwith Camel and a replica Fokker Triplane, was loosely patterned after a real dogfight between German ace Werner Voss and a flight of aircraft led by British ace James McCudden.

Due to the attention to period details and the use of actual aircraft in the flying scenes, The Great Waldo Pepper is well-regarded among aviation films, receiving a "four-star" rating by film and aviation historians Jack Hardwick and Ed Schnepf. Released in a number of home media formats, there are no extra features in the latest DVD.

Former silent screen actress Viola Dana was an honored guest at the premiere of The Great Waldo Pepper. In 1920, Dana had begun a relationship with Ormer "Lock" Locklear, a daring aviator, military veteran and budding film star, reputed to be the prototype for the character of Waldo Pepper. Locklear died when his aircraft crashed on August 2, 1920 during a nighttime film shoot for the Fox Studios feature, The Skywayman. 

The title of Geraldine McCaughrean’s 2009 novel, The Death-Defying Pepper Roux, was inspired by the title of the 1975 Robert Redford 1920s aviation film, The Great Waldo Pepper.

See also
 List of American films of 1975

References
Notes

Citations

Bibliography

 de Haro, Roberto. Twist of Fate: Love, Intrigue, and the Great War. Bloomington, Indiana: iUniverse, 2012. .
 Farmer, James H. Celluloid Wings: The Impact of Movies on Aviation. Blue Ridge Summit, Pennsylvania: Tab Books Inc., 1984. .
 Goldman, William. Which Lie Did I Tell?. London: Bloomsbury, 2000. .
 Hardwick, Jack and Ed Schnepf. "A Viewer's Guide to Aviation Movies". The Making of the Great Aviation Films, General Aviation Series, Volume 2, 1989.
 Maltin, Leonard. Leonard Maltin's Movie Guide 2009. New York: New American Library, 2009 (originally published as TV Movies, then Leonard Maltin’s Movie & Video Guide), First edition 1969, published annually since 1988. .

External links

 
 
 
 

1975 films
1975 drama films
American drama films
American aviation films
Films scored by Henry Mancini
Films about stunt performers
Films directed by George Roy Hill
Films set in the 1920s
Films set in 1926
Films set in the 1930s
Films shot in San Antonio
Films shot in Texas
Films with screenplays by William Goldman
Universal Pictures films
1970s English-language films
1970s American films